The Amazing Spider-Man: Chance Encounter! is a graphic novel by Todd McFarlane published by Boxtree in 1996.

Contents
The Amazing Spider-Man: Chance Encounter! is a collection of two stories that pit Spider-Man against Morbius, the Living Vampire, in the 1971 tale "Sub City" and the rich supervillain Chance in 1987's "Chance Encounters".

Reception
Dean Evans reviewed The Amazing Spider-Man: Chance Encounter! for Arcane magazine, rating it a 7 out of 10 overall. Evans comments that "The collection [...] is mainly notable as a showcase of McFarlane's early artistry, exhibiting the seeds of a visual style that catapulted the celebrated Spawn comic into the best-seller list. You can't help feeling that a measly two tales isn't much for your [money], so many of us are going to feel a bit ripped-off, but the hardcore fans out there certainly won't be disappointed with the quality of the stories."

References

Marvel Comics graphic novels